Angara Sullia is an Indian politician who is the current Minister of state for Fisheries, Ports and Inland Transport Department of Karnataka from January 2021. He is a six term member of the Karnataka Legislative Assembly. He is currently minister for second time from 4 August 2021.

Early life
Angara was born in Dasanakaje House, Amaramudnoor Village, Sullia Taluk. His early education was completed  in Chokkadi High School.

Constituency
He represents the Sullia constituency since 1994.

Political Party
He is from the Bharatiya Janata Party.

External links 
 Karnataka Legislative Assembly

References 

Karnataka MLAs 2004–2007
Living people
Bharatiya Janata Party politicians from Karnataka
Karnataka MLAs 2018–2023
1964 births